Ras-related protein Rab-14 is a protein that in humans is encoded by the RAB14 gene.

References

Further reading